Lesbian, gay, bisexual, and transgender (LGBT) persons in Equatorial Guinea face legal challenges not experienced by non-LGBT residents. Both male and female same-sex sexual activity is legal in Equatorial Guinea, however LGBT persons face stigmatization among the broader population, and same-sex couples and households headed by same-sex couples are not eligible for the same legal protections available as opposite-sex couples.

Laws regarding same-sex sexual activity 
Although there are no laws against homosexuality in Equatorial Guinea, the International Lesbian, Gay, Bisexual, Trans and Intersex Association (ILGA) report "there is evidence that State intimidation of sexually diverse individuals persists." The criminal code in force in Equatorial Guinea is a revision of the Spanish Criminal Code that dates back to the Francoist era and is said to post-colonially carry anti-homophobic undertones that influence those perception today. The age of consent is set at 18, regardless of gender and/or sexual orientation.

Recognition of same-sex relationships
Same-sex couples have no legal recognition.

Discrimination protections
There is no protection against discrimination based on sexual orientation or gender identity.

Living conditions
The U.S. Department of State's 2010 Human Rights Report found that "there are no laws criminalizing sexual orientation; however, societal stigmatization and traditional discrimination against gay men and lesbians was strong, and the government made little effort to combat it".

Summary table

See also

Human rights in Equatorial Guinea
LGBT rights in Africa

References

Equatorial Guinea
LGBT in Equatorial Guinea
Human rights in Equatorial Guinea